Palia de la Orăștie is the first known translation of the Pentateuch in Romanian. The book was printed in 1582 in the town of Orăștie, then a local center of reformation within the Principality of Transylvania, possibly under the patronage of Stephen Báthory. It was written using the Romanian Cyrillic alphabet and is the earliest known translation, even partial, of the Old Testament in Romanian.

Name and contents
Palia (gr. παλαιά "old") refers to the Old Testament. In the preserved preface it says that all five books of the Pentateuch were printed but only the first two, Genesis and Exodus, have survived.

Printing
The volume containing 164 pages was translated into Romanian by: Mihai Tordaș (Turdach Mihaly), the protestant bishop of Banat and Hunedoara; Archirie Pamadopleu, protopop of Hunedoara; the pastor Stephen Herczeg; Ephrem Zacham Bar Ephraim, teacher of literature and Biblical languages (Hebrew, Ancient Greek and Latin); and Moisi Pesahiel, pastor. The expenses for translation and printing were covered by the nobleman Ferenc Geszti. The printing was done by the deacons Serban (the son of the printer Coresi) and Marian.

References

1582 books
Romanian books
Orăștie